Salem Municipality (Salems kommun) is a municipality in Stockholm County in east central Sweden. The name traces its origins from Slæm in the 13th century, but was changed to Salem in the 17th century, inspired by the Biblical name of Jerusalem. Its seat is located in Salem.

History

Like the rest of the areas around Lake Mälaren, Salem has a significant amount of ancient remains, as far back as the Stone Age. The church of Salem traces its foundation to the 12th century.

Just like its eastern municipal neighbour Botkyrka, Salem traces its history back to the legendary Saint Botvid, who lived in the area sometime between 1050-1120. In the medieval tradition, a spring would always be found in connection to the death of a saint. According to legend, when the remains of Saint Botvid were transported to the church in today's Botkyrka, the casket was temporarily put down near the shore of Lake Bornsjön, where a spring poured up. It continues to provide clear water to this day.

Today
Salem was united with the municipality of Botkyrka during the Swedish municipal reform between 1971-1974. However, in 1983, after energetic protests, they were split apart, and Salem became the 14th smallest municipality by area in the country. 

Salem is served by one station, Rönninge, on the commuter train line between Södertälje and Märsta via Stockholm. There are also a good network of bus lines.

The number of people in Salem is about 30% less during day time due to that it has the biggest percentage of people in Stockholm county that work outside own municipal.

Demography

Population development

Residents with a foreign background
On the 31st of December 2017 the number of people with a foreign background (persons born outside of Sweden or with two parents born outside of Sweden) was 4 643, or 27.86% of the population (16 665 on the 31st of December 2017). On the 31st of December 2002 the number of residents with a foreign background was (per the same definition) 2 468, or 17.79% of the population (13 875 on the 31st of December 2002). On 31 December 2017 there were 16 665 residents in Salem, of which 3 270 people (19.62%) were born in a country other than Sweden. Divided by country in the table below - the Nordic countries as well as the 12 most common countries of birth outside of Sweden for Swedish residents have been included, with other countries of birth bundled together by continent by Statistics Sweden.

References

External links

Salem Municipality - Official site

 
Municipalities of Stockholm County
Metropolitan Stockholm